American-born Australian actress and producer Nicole Kidman has been honored with numerous accolades throughout her career. Among them, she has won an Academy Award, two Primetime Emmy Awards, six Golden Globe Awards, and a BAFTA Award. She is the first Australian to win the Academy Award for Best Actress. In 2003, Kidman received a star on the Hollywood Walk of Fame for her contributions to the motion picture industry. In addition to her 2003 Academy Award for Best Actress, Kidman has received Best Actress awards from the following critics' associations or award-granting organisations: the Hollywood Foreign Press Association (Golden Globe Award), the Australian Film Institute, Blockbuster Entertainment Awards, Empire Awards, Satellite Awards, Hollywood Film Awards, London Film Critics' Circle, Russian Guild of Film Critics, and the Southeastern Film Critics Association. In 2003, Kidman was given the American Cinematheque Award. She also received recognition from the National Association of Theatre Owners at the ShoWest Convention in 1992 as the Female Star of Tomorrow, and in 2002 for a Distinguished Decade of Achievement in Film Award.

Major associations

Academy Awards 
1 win of 5 nominations

BAFTA Awards 
1 win of 5 nominations

Golden Globe Awards 
6 wins of 17 nominations

Primetime Emmy Awards 
2 wins of 3 nominations

Producers Guild Awards 
0 wins of 3 nominations

Screen Actors Guild Awards 
1 win of 15 nominations

Audience awards

Golden Schmoes awards 
2 wins of 6 nominations

MTV Movie + TV awards 
2 wins of 7 nominations

Nickelodeon Kid's Choice awards 
0 wins of 3 nominations

People's Choice awards 
0 wins of 3 nominations

Teen Choice awards 
0 wins of 1 nomination

Critic association awards

Alliance of Women Film Journalists awards 
0 wins of 8 nominations

Australian Film Critics Association awards 
3 wins of 4 nominations

Award Circuit Community awards 
2 wins of 10 nominations

Boston Society of Film Critics awards 
1 win of 1 nomination

Central Ohio Film Critics Association awards 
0 wins of 2 nominations

Chicago Film Critics Association awards 
0 wins of 1 nomination

Critics' Choice Movie Awards 
1 win of 11 nominations

Critics' Choice Television Awards 
2 wins of 4 nominations

Dallas-Fort Worth Film Critics Association awards 
0 wins of 6 nominations

Denver Film Critics Society awards 
0 wins of 2 nominations

Detroit Film Critics Society awards 
0 wins of 2 nominations

Film Critics Circle of Australia awards 
0 wins of 5 nominations

Gay and Lesbian Entertainment Critics Association awards 
1 win of 2 nomination

Georgia Film Critics Association awards 
0 wins of 1 nomination

Greater Western New York Film Critics Association awards 
0 wins of 1 nomination

Hawaii Film Critics Society 
0 wins of 2 nominations

Hollywood Critics Association awards 
0 wins of 2 nominations

Houston Film Critics Society awards 
0 wins of 1 nomination

Kansas City Film Critics Circle awards 
1 win of 1 nomination

Las Vegas Film Critics Society awards 
1 win of 4 nominations

London Critics Circle Film awards 
2 wins of 4 nominations

Los Angeles Online Film Critics Society 
0 wins of 1 nomination

Nevada Film Critics Society 
1 wins of 1 nomination

New York Film Critics Circle awards 
0 wins of 2 nominations

North Carolina Film Critics Association awards 
0 wins of 2 nomination

North Texas Film Critics Association awards 
0 wins of 1 nomination

Online Film & Television Association awards 
1 wins of 10 nominations

Online Film Critics Society awards 
0 wins of 2 nominations

Phoenix Critics Circle 
0 wins of 1 nomination

Phoenix Film Critics Society awards 
0 wins of 3 nominations

San Diego Film Critics Society awards 
1 wins of 3 nomination

Seattle Film Critics awards 
0 wins of 1 nomination

Southeastern Film Critics Association awards 
1 win of 2 nominations

St. Louis Film Critics Association awards 
0 wins of 3 nominations

Sunset Film Critics Circle 
0 wins of 2 nominations

Television Critics Association awards 
0 wins of 1 nomination

Utah Film Critics Association awards 
0 wins of 2 nominations

Vancouver Film Critics Circle awards 
0 wins of 1 nomination

Washington D. C. Area Film Critics Association awards 
0 wins of 4 nominations

Women Film Critics Circle awards 
2 wins of 4 nominations

Women's Image Network awards 
1 win of 1 nomination

Film festival awards

Baja International Film Festival awards 
1 win of 1 nomination

Berlin International Film Festival awards 
1 win of 1 nomination

Cannes Film Festival awards 
1 win of 1 nomination

Capri Hollywood International Film Festival 
1 win of 1 nomination

Global Non-Violent Film Festival Awards 
1 win of 1 nomination

Heartland Film Festival awards 
1 win of 1 nomination

Hollywood Film Festival awards 
3 wins of 3 nominations

Mill Valley Film Festival awards 
1 win of 1 nomination

New York Film Festival awards 
1 win of 1 nomination

Noir in Festival 2018 
1 win of 1 nomination

Palm Springs International Film Festival awards 
3 wins of 3 nominations

Santa Barbara International Film Festival awards 
2 win of 2 nominations

Seattle International Film Festival awards 
1 win of 1 nomination

SESC Film Festival awards 
1 win of 1 nomination

Shanghai International Film Festival awards 
1 win of 1 nomination

ShoWest Convention awards 
2 wins of 2 nominations

Taormina Film Festival 
1 win of 1 nomination

International awards

AACTA International awards 
3 wins of 9 nominations

American Cinematheque Gala Tribute awards 
1 win of 1 nomination

American Comedy awards 
0 wins of 1 nomination

AACTA Australian Film Academy awards 
4 win of 8 nominations

Bodil Awards 
0 win of 1 nomination

British Academy Film & Television awards 
1 win of 5 nominations

Chlotrudis Awards 
0 wins of 1 nomination

CinEuphoria awards 
3 wins of 7 nominations

Criticos de Cinema Online Portugueses awards 
0 wins of 1 nomination

Empire awards 
3 wins of 6 nominations

Golden Camera awards 
1 win of 1 nomination

Goya Awards 
0 wins of 1 nomination

Huading Awards 
1 win of 1 nomination

International Cinephile Society awards 
0 wins of 3 nominations

International Online Cinema awards 
1 win of 7 nominations

Irish Film and Television Awards 
0 win of 1 nomination

Italian Online Movie awards 
1 win of 3 nominations

Jupiter awards 
2 wins of 2 nominations

Logie awards 
3 wins of 3 nominations

National Movie awards 
0 wins of 1 nomination

Russian Guild of Film Critics awards 
1 win of 2 nominations

Russian National Movie awards 
0 wins of 2 nominations

Sant Jordi awards 
0 wins of 1 nomination

Yoga awards 
1 win of 1 nomination

Miscellaneous awards

AARP Movies for Grown-Ups Awards 
1 wins of 6 nomination

Blockbuster Entertainment awards 
2 wins of 3 nominations

Cinema Bloggers Awards 
0 wins of 1 nomination

Cinema Writers Circle awards 
0 wins of 1 nomination

Elle Women in Hollywood awards 
4 wins of 4 nominations

Fangoria Chainsaw awards 
1 win of 1 nomination

Fright Meter awards 
1 win of 2 nominations

Golden Raspberry awards 
1 win of 2 nominations

Gotham awards 
1 win of 2 nominations

British GQ Awards 
1 win of 1 nominations

Harper's BAZAAR Women of the Year awards 
1 win of 1 nomination

IF awards 
0 wins of 1 nomination

Independent Spirit awards 
0 wins of 1 nomination

Satellite awards 
4 wins of 19 nominations

Saturn awards 
1 win of 7 nominations

SyFy Portal Genre awards 
0 wins of 1 nomination

The Stinkers Bad Movie awards
0 wins of 3 nominations

Village Voice Film Poll awards 
0 wins of 1 nomination

Walk of Fame 
1 win of 1 nomination

Women in Film Crystal + Lucy awards 
1 win of 1 nomination

Theatre awards

Evening Standard Theatre Awards 
1 win of 1 nomination

Laurence Olivier Awards 
0 wins of 2 nominations

WhatsOnStage Awards 
1 win of 1 nomination

References 

List of awards and nominations
Lists of awards received by Australian actor